Kalen Douglas DeBoer (born October 24, 1974) is an American football coach. He is the head football coach at the University of Washington. DeBoer served as the head football coach at the University of Sioux Falls from 2005 to 2009 and California State University, Fresno from 2020 to 2021. At Sioux Falls, his teams won three NAIA Football National Championships, in 2006, 2008, and 2009.

Early life and education
Born and raised in Milbank, South Dakota, DeBoer graduated from Milbank High School. Attending the University of Sioux Falls, DeBoer played at wide receiver from 1993 to 1996 for the Sioux Falls Cougars under head coach Bob Young, setting school records for receptions (234), receiving yardage (3,400) and touchdown catches (33) and earned All-American honors. DeBoer was a student assistant at Sioux Falls in 1997 after his football playing career ended, and he graduated in 1998 with a bachelor's degree in secondary education.

DeBoer also played baseball at Sioux Falls, hitting .520 with 10 home runs and 34 RBIs in his senior season of 1997. In 1998, DeBoer played one season of independent league baseball with the Canton Crocodiles as a left fielder.

Coaching career
After graduating from the University of Sioux Falls, DeBoer remained in the city of Sioux Falls, South Dakota as an assistant coach at Washington High School. After two years at Washington, DeBoer reunited with Bob Young and returned to his alma mater as offensive coordinator, a position he held from 2000 to 2004.

Following Young's retirement, Sioux Falls promoted DeBoer to head coach on December 1, 2004. As head coach from 2005 to 2009, DeBoer had a record of 67–3 and won three NAIA national championships in 2006, 2008, and 2009 and a runner-up appearance in 2007. Two of DeBoer's losses at Sioux Falls came at the hands of Mike Van Diest's national title-winning Carroll Fighting Saints squads in 2005 and 2007.

DeBoer was the offensive coordinator at Southern Illinois from 2010 to 2013 under Dale Lennon. He held the same position at Eastern Michigan University from 2014 to 2016 under Chris Creighton, at Fresno State from 2017 to 2018 under Jeff Tedford, and most recently at Indiana under Tom Allen in 2019. The Hoosiers averaged 443.6 yards per game under DeBoer, ranking second in the Big Ten for the season.

In 2020, DeBoer was hired as the head football coach at California State University, Fresno.

On November 29, 2021, DeBoer was hired as the head football coach at the University of Washington.

Head coaching record

Notes

References

External links
 
 Fresno State profile
 Indiana profile

1974 births
Living people
American football wide receivers
Eastern Michigan Eagles football coaches
Indiana Hoosiers football coaches
Fresno State Bulldogs football coaches
Sioux Falls Cougars football coaches
Sioux Falls Cougars football players
Southern Illinois Salukis football coaches
Sioux Falls Storm players
Washington Huskies football coaches
High school football coaches in South Dakota
Canton Crocodiles players
Baseball outfielders
People from Milbank, South Dakota
Coaches of American football from South Dakota
Players of American football from South Dakota
Baseball players from South Dakota